Bernard "Bunny" Jacob was a Jewish businessman in Calcutta who was a director of the B.N. Elias and Company trading conglomerate and the last conductor of the Calcutta Symphony Orchestra.

Family
Jacob was the son of J.R. Jacob and Lily Elias. He had a brother Ronnie. He married his first cousin, Philomena "Philo" Gubbay, around 1949.

Career
Jacob was a director of the B.N. Elias and Company trading conglomerate. The firm traded in jute and tobacco, and owned real estate.

Music
Jacob and Ronnie studied music with Phillipé Sandré and Jacob took a keen interest in the Calcutta School of Music. He was the last conductor of the now defunct Calcutta Symphony Orchestra. Later, he was active in music in England.

See also
History of the Jews in Kolkata

References 

Indian conductors (music)
Businesspeople from Kolkata
Year of birth missing
Year of death missing
Indian Jews